Tape art is an artwork created with adhesive tape such as duct tape or packing tape. It developed from urban art in the 1960s, as an alternative to the widely spread use of spray cans in the urban art scene. Tape can be used to produce a "stained glass" effect when applied to glass or plastic which is lit from behind. It can be attached to a wall to form the outline or an image, or can be shaped into three-dimensional sculptures such as Mark Jenkins (artist) who uses clear packing tape to create sculptural street installations.

Tape artists such as Max Zorn show their work at art fairs including Art Basel Miami.

Characteristics 

Tape art can be installed quickly and almost silently, making it suitable for small or temporary urban art projects. No masking or covering is necessary. Tape is relatively easy to handle, and can be applied to various surfaces, such as stone, asphalt, wood, aluminum, sandwich panels or glass. Interior installations work just as well as exterior ones. Unlike spray paint art, tape art can be removed easily without leaving a permanent mark.

Materials for tape art vary depending on which tape is being used. Tape art can use duct tape, packing tape, masking tape or other products. Unlike traditional paintings and sculptures, tape art can be applied anywhere, including the doors, ceilings and floors of galleries. Duct tape can be used to construct three-dimensional sculptures.

Gallery

Artists 
 Slava Ostap
 Max Zorn (artist)
 Mark Khaisman
 Achim Zeman
 Motorefisico

References

External links 

Tape Art Interview with Tape Over on Artconnect
Tape Mapping by Tape Over - combining tape art and video mapping

Visual arts genres
Contemporary art
Adhesive tape
Graffiti and unauthorised signage